Seoul Metropolitan City Route 41 is an urban road located in Seoul, South Korea.

Stopovers

 Seoul
 Seocho District - Gangnam District - Yongsan District - Jung District - Jongno District - Seongbuk District - Gangbuk District - Dobong District - Gangbuk District

List of Facilities 
IS: Intersection, IC: Interchange

References

Roads in Seoul
AH1